Brazieria velata is a species of air-breathing land snails, terrestrial pulmonate gastropod mollusks in the family Zonitidae, the true glass snails. This species is endemic to Micronesia. It was listed as Vulnerable in 1994 until changing to Data Deficient two years later.

References

Fauna of Micronesia
velata
Taxonomy articles created by Polbot